This is the discography of English new wave/synth-pop band Heaven 17.

Albums

Studio albums

Live albums

Compilation albums

Remix albums

Box sets

EPs

Singles

Videos

Video albums

Music videos

Soundtrack appearances

References 

Discographies of British artists
Pop music group discographies
New wave discographies